is a former Japanese musical composer, keyboardist, singer-songwriter, bassist and guitarist under Vermillion records label.

Biography
During high school times at age of 16, he went studying English for 4 years in Los Angeles.

In 1987, Kuribayashi had started his career as a composer. Stay in my eyes (from album Summer Dream) music composition was provided to popular Japanese band Tube from 80s.

On the same year, he joined to the special unit with Oda Tetsuro and vocalist of Tube, Nagisa no All Stars.

In 1989 he made his major solo debut with album La Jolla.

In years 1990–1993 he was a member of music group B.B.Queens as an back-vocalist and bassist.

In years 1993–1994 he was member of rock band Zyyg.

Meanwhile, as soloist and composer, he'd been providing numerous compositions for artist such as Zard, Maki Ohguro, Wands, Deen and Manish.

In 1995 he created his solo project under the name Barbier with single Christmas Time.

In 1997 he held the first public live Kuribayashi Seiichiro LIVE TOUR '97 "No Pose".
Three videoclips from live were included in Music Video DVD footage BEST LIVE & CLIPS released by Being Inc.

In 1998 he released his final studio album Frosted Glass.

In 1999 he held his last live tour 98 Frosted Glass in Shibuya Quatro.

Since then his activities are unknown.

Discography
During his career he has released 9 studio albums, one compilation album and four singles.

Studio albumsLa Jolla (1989)Summer Illusion (1990)You Never Know (1991)Good-bye to you (1991)Awanakutemo I Love You (1993)Tooku Hanaretemo (1994)Rest of My Life  (1995)Barbier first  (1996) (as Barbier)No Pose (1997)Frosted Glass  (1998)

Compilation album
complete of Kuribayashi Seiichiro&Barbier at the BEING studio (2003)

SinglesTrend wa Shiro no Theme (Shiroi My Love (1990)Good-bye to you (1991)Christmas Time (1995) (as Barbier)Love: Nemurezuni Kimi no Yokogao Zutto Miteita'' (1996) (as Barbier)

List of provided works
Hideki Saijo
Mou Ichido

Zard 
Unmei no Roulette Mawashite
Tooi Hoshi wo Kazoete
Mō Sukoshi, Ato Sukoshi...
Kimi ga Inai
Promised You
Don't You See!
Sayonara wa Ima mo Kono Mune ni Imasu
Change my mind
Tasogare ni My Lonely Heart
Boy
Season
If you gimme smile
etc.

T-Bolan
Osarekirenai Kono Kimochi

Michiya Haruhata 
Smile on me

Keiko Utoku 
Mabushii Hito

Dimension
Mirage

Deen
Itsuka Kitto
Eien wo Azuketekure
Teenage Dream

Rev
Kowarenagara Utsukushiku nare

Manish
Hashiridase Lonely Night
Yuzurenai Toki
Kimi no Sora ni Naritai

Wands
Sabishisa wa Aki no Iro
Secret Night -It's My Treat-
Jumpin' Jack Boy

Maki Ohguro
Return to My Love

Tube
Dance with you
Remember me

Sayuri Iwata
Kowareta Piano

Magazine appearances
From Music Freak Magazine:
Vol.11: 1995/October
Vol.14: 1996/January
Vol.19: 1996/June (Barbier)
Vol.25: 1996/December (Barbier''')
Vol.28: 1997/March
Vol.29: 1997/April

External links
Official site (WebArchived) 
BeingGiza profile 
Musing profile

References

1965 births
20th-century Japanese composers
Being Inc. artists
Japanese male composers
Living people
20th-century Japanese male singers
20th-century Japanese singers